Athabasca County is a municipal district in north central Alberta, Canada. It is located northeast of Edmonton and is in Census Division No. 13.  Prior to an official renaming on December 1, 2009, Athabasca County was officially known as the County of Athabasca No. 12.

Geography

Communities and localities 
The following urban municipalities are surrounded by Athabasca County.

Cities
none
Towns
Athabasca
Villages
Boyle
Summer villages
Bondiss
Island Lake
Island Lake South
Mewatha Beach
South Baptiste
Sunset Beach
West Baptiste
Whispering Hills

The following hamlets are located within Athabasca County.
Hamlets
Atmore
Breynat
Caslan
Colinton
Donatville
Ellscott
Grassland
Meanook
Perryvale
Rochester
Wandering River

The following localities are located within Athabasca County.
Localities

Amber Valley
Amesbury
Athabasca Acres
Athabasca Landing Settlement
Balay Subdivision
Baptiste Lake
Big Coulee
Blue Jay
Century Estates
Coolidge
Dakin
Deep Creek
Frains
Glenshaw
Grosmont
Kinikinik
Lahaieville

Lincoln
Lyall Subdivision
McNabb's
Meadowbrook

O'Morrow
Paxson
Pine Grove Estates
Pleasant View
Prosperity
Richmond Park
Sarrail
Sawdy
Spruce Valley
West Wind Trailer Park
White Gull
Lakes
North Buck Lake

Demographics 

In the 2016 Census of Population conducted by Statistics Canada, Athabasca County had a population of 7,869 living in 3,067 of its 4,093 total private dwellings, a  change from its 2011 population of 7,662.

See also 
List of communities in Alberta
List of municipal districts in Alberta

References

External links 

 
Municipal districts in Alberta